Mumazpur is a village of Sarai Alamgir, Punjab, Pakistan situated on GT Road Sarai Alamgir. It is about 10 km away from the main city of Sarai Alamgir.

Language
As per national census of 1998 Punjabi is the main language of Sarai Alamgir spoken by 94% population. Urdu, the national language, is spoken widely while English spoken by educated elite.

Facilities
 Religious Educational Institutions (One Islamic School)
 Private Schools " Al Bilal Academy"

Castes

Arain
Pathan
Raja
Mirza
Cobbler

Religion

 Islam almost 100% followers
 Four Mosques

Agriculture

Mostly peoples having agriculture business here which are the bone of the economy.

Main Crops
 Wheat
 Corn
 Rice
 Sugarcane
 Vegetables:  turnip, carrot, broad beans, eggplant, tomato, cucumber, onion, garlic, red chili, potato, Momordica charantia, pumpkin, white radish and spinach
 Fruit:   mangoes, oranges, guava, watermelon, lemons and strawberries

References

Mummaz Pur Map Location

Villages in Gujrat District